Luis Vélez de Guevara (born Luis Vélez de Santander) (1 August 1579 – 10 November 1644) was a Spanish dramatist and novelist.
He was born at Écija and was of Jewish converso descent.
After graduating as a sizar at the University of Osuna in 1596, he joined the household of Rodrigo de Castro, Cardinal-Archbishop of Seville, and celebrated the marriage of Philip III in a poem signed Vélez de Santander, a name which he continued to use till some years later.

It seems he served as a soldier in Italy and Algiers, returning to Spain in 1602 when he entered the service of the count de Saldaña, and dedicated himself to writing for the stage. He died at Madrid on 10 November 1644.

Velez de Guevara was the author of over four hundred plays, of which the best are Reinar despues de morir, La Luna de la Sierra, and El Diablo está en Cantillana. The play Más pesa el rey que la sangre, which translates into "The King weighs more than blood (kinship)" is based on the episode of the Reconquista in which the nobleman Alonso Pérez de Guzmán allows his son to be sacrificed, rather than surrender his King's possession of Tarifa. However, Vélez de Guevara is most widely known as the author of El diablo cojuelo (1641, "The Lame Devil" or "The Crippled Devil"), a fantastic novel which suggested to Alain-René Lesage the idea for Le Diable boiteux (1707).   The plot presents a rascal student that hides in an astrologer's mansard.  He frees a devil from a bottle.  As an acknowledgement the devil shows him the apartments of Madrid and the tricks, miseries and mischiefs of their inhabitants. A similar theme was suggested by the magic lenses in Los anteojos de mejor vista (1620–1625) by Rodrigo Fernández de Ribera. Charles Dickens refers to El Diablo cojuelo in The Old Curiosity Shop, chapter thirty-three.

References

External links
 
 
 
 Works by Luis Vélez de Guevara at Biblioteca Virtual Miguel de Cervantes

Spanish poets
Spanish Baroque people
Spanish Golden Age
1579 births
1644 deaths
People from Écija
Spanish male dramatists and playwrights
Spanish male poets
17th-century Spanish dramatists and playwrights
17th-century Spanish poets
Baroque writers